Zaychar Glacier is the 7.5 km long and 2.7 km wide glacier on Nordenskjöld Coast in Graham Land, Antarctica.  It drains the southeast slopes of Detroit Plateau, flowing east-southeastwards between Grivitsa Ridge and Kableshkov Ridge, and entering Odrin Bay in Weddell Sea 5 km northwest of Fothergill Point.

The glacier is named after the settlement of Zaychar in Southeastern Bulgaria.

Location
British mapping in 1978.

Maps
 British Antarctic Territory.  Scale 1:200000 topographic map.  DOS 610 Series, Sheet W 64 60.  Directorate of Overseas Surveys, UK, 1978.
 Antarctic Digital Database (ADD). Scale 1:250000 topographic map of Antarctica. Scientific Committee on Antarctic Research (SCAR). Since 1993, regularly upgraded and updated.

References
 Zaychar Glacier. SCAR Composite Antarctic Gazetteer.
 Bulgarian Antarctic Gazetteer. Antarctic Place-names Commission. (details in Bulgarian, basic data in English)

External links
 Zaychar Glacier. Copernix satellite image

Glaciers of Nordenskjöld Coast
Bulgaria and the Antarctic